Norwich Bus Station is situated off Surrey Street and Queen's Road, Norwich, Norfolk, England.  It is served by a number of bus operators, such as Konectbus, Norse, First Eastern Counties, National Express, Megabus and City Sightseeing Norwich.

The land between Surrey Street and Bull Lane was acquired in April 1934 by the Eastern Counties Omnibus Company. The huge garage and station were designed by architect H J Starkey and it was opened in 1936 by the Lord Mayor Walter Riley. The garage had the biggest unsupported roof span in the country with no pillars or supports in the 52,000 sq ft of floor space. The garage structure was said to have weighed 220 tonnes and 650,000 bricks and nine miles of electric cable went into its construction.

The Norwich PT Major transportation project, identified the need for a new bus station as the catalyst for the regeneration of an important social and commercial area of Norwich which was previously neglected. Funding was awarded in November 2002, Planning consent granted in December 2003, Demolition and Construction commenced in February 2004, partial opening of the through road for the Park & Ride was achieved April 2005.

The new Bus Station opened on 30 August 2005 at a cost of £5 million and two months later than planned, with its distinctive steel roof it won the 2006 SCALA Civic Building of the Year Award. The roof though has caused problems and in June 2012 the bus station had to be closed for two weeks to allow contractors to replace much of the roof to fix leaks.

On average the bus station sees 7,800 bus movements, 200,000 passengers boarding, and the information centre helps 21,000 people per week.

Bus routes
Most local bus operations in Norwich depart from either Castle Meadow, near Norwich Castle, St. Stephen's Street or from Theatre Street, near Norwich's Theatre Royal, with the bus station reserved for long-distance express services, coach services or Park and Ride services, with a few local services operating out of the terminus.

Most notable routes which operate from the bus station, include First Eastern Counties flagship X1 and excel (Buses display “XL”) services. The X1 runs between Norwich and Lowestoft, via Great Yarmouth and the excel between Norwich and Peterborough, via Dereham and King's Lynn. Since 2013, modern, state of the art, double deck buses have been used on the route, offering passengers free WiFi, leather seats and air conditioning. 

Competing with this, is Konectbus 'KonectExpress' service 8, operating between the bus station and Dereham and Toftwood.

First Eastern Counties service X2 also departs for Lowestoft, via the A146 road, calling at Loddon
and Beccles.

Facilities
The travel centre contains a waiting area that can seat up to thirty people, male, female and disabled toilets, plus baby changing facilities as well as a café.

References

External links
Norfolk County Council - Norwich Bus Station 

Bus stations in England
Buildings and structures in Norwich
Transport in Norwich